Ajdabiya Marsh is a protected area of Libya.

References

Protected areas of Libya
Ajdabiya